Araracuara is a genus of flowering plants belonging to the family Rhamnaceae.

Its native range is Colombia.

Species:

Araracuara vetusta

References

Rhamnaceae
Rhamnaceae genera